The 2002–03 Cypriot Fourth Division was the 18th season of the Cypriot fourth-level football league. Orfeas Nicosia won their 1st title.

Format
Thirteen teams participated in the 2002–03 Cypriot Fourth Division. All teams played against each other twice, once at their home and once away. The team with the most points at the end of the season crowned champions. The first three teams were promoted to the 2003–04 Cypriot Third Division and the last two teams were relegated to regional leagues.

Point system
Teams received three points for a win, one point for a draw and zero points for a loss.

Changes from previous season
Teams promoted to 2002–03 Cypriot Third Division
 AEM Mesogis
 Elpida Xylofagou
 Achyronas Liopetriou

Teams relegated from 2001–02 Cypriot Third Division
 PEFO Olympiakos
 Rotsidis Mammari
 ATE PEK Ergaton

Teams promoted from regional leagues
 Olympos Xylofagou
 Evagoras Pallikarides Agion Trimithias
 AOL Omonia Lakatamias

Teams relegated to regional leagues
 THOI Avgorou
 AMEK Kapsalou
 ASPIS Pylas
 Proodos Kaimakliou

Notes: 
AMEP Parekklisia withdrew before the start of the season.

League standings

Results

See also
 Cypriot Fourth Division
 2002–03 Cypriot First Division
 2002–03 Cypriot Cup

Sources

Cypriot Fourth Division seasons
Cyprus
2002–03 in Cypriot football